Louise Margaret Yazbeck (August 13, 1910 – July 10, 1995) was an American composer and teacher.

She was born in Shreveport, Louisiana to a family of Syrian descent. After attending Centenary College and Washington University, she returned to Shreveport where she composed, taught piano, sponsored the B Natural Music Club, and belonged to several professional arts organizations. She was active in the United States Service Organizations during World War II.

Yazbeck's compositions include:

Piano 
Lebanese-Syrian March in D Major
Lebanese-Syrian March in G Major

Vocal 
"Echoes"
"Federation Song" (words by  Eva Kouri Solomon; music by Louise Yazbeck)
"Good Old Southern Blues"
"SFSLAC" (Southern Federation of Syrian Lebanese American Clubs; words by Eva Kouri Solomon; music by Louise Yazbeck)

References 

American women composers
American composers
1910 births
1995 deaths
20th-century American women
20th-century American people
American people of Syrian descent
Centenary College of Louisiana alumni
Washington University in St. Louis alumni